Nguyen Van Troi Bridge is a bridge spanning the Han River in the city of Da Nang, Vietnam.This bridge was built by an American company in 1965.

References

Bridges in Vietnam
Bridges in Da Nang
Bridges completed in 1965